Elections were held in the state of Western Australia on 6 February 1993 to elect all 57 members to the Legislative Assembly and all 34 members to the Legislative Council. The three-term Labor government, led by Premier Dr Carmen Lawrence since 12 February 1990, was defeated by the Liberal-National coalition, led by Opposition Leader Richard Court since 12 May 1992.

Results

Legislative Assembly

|}

Notes:
 Andrew Mensaros, the former Liberal member for Floreat, resigned from parliament on 16 May 1991 due to ill health. Dr Liz Constable, who had Mensaros's support, ran as an Independent against the endorsed Liberal candidate in the resulting by-election on 20 July 1991, and won.

Legislative Council

|}

Seats changing parties

 Members listed in italics did not contest their seat at this election.

Post-election pendulum

See also
 Candidates of the 1993 Western Australian state election
 Members of the Western Australian Legislative Assembly, 1989–1993
 Members of the Western Australian Legislative Assembly, 1993–1996

References

Elections in Western Australia
Western Australian state election
1990s in Western Australia
Western Australian state election